Jungle Sound: The Bassline Strikes Back! is a compilation album, released in 2004 by the British independent record label Breakbeat Kaos, and reissued in 2006 as Jungle Sound: Gold. It featured tracks from artists such as Fresh, Pendulum and Adam F. The album was mixed by Paul Harding from Pendulum, although there was no mention of it in the original artwork.

Jungle Sound: Gold

The reissue saw the unmixed disc replaced by a new unmixed one. The album's artwork was changed to credit Pendulum for mixing the album, which became notable for its controversy. Shortly after the release, Rob Swire denounced on the Dogs on Acid forum that he did not know of the release, and did not give permission. This caused an uproar in the thread, many members believing that Fresh was capitalizing on the success of Hold Your Colour. The scandal eventually caused Pendulum to leave the label. Also, in Jungle Sound Gold, a mistake was made in the track list of disc 2. The first track "Intro" was "Masochist", which made a shift in all song titles, making all of them wrong, and having "Another Planet" named as "Untitled Track". Moreover, disc 1 was the mixed album by Pendulum while disc 2 contained the unmixed tracks.

Track listing

Reissue
The reissue sees the unmixed disc replaced by a new unmixed one.

References

2004 compilation albums
Drum and bass albums
Drum and bass compilation albums